Golf at the 2021 Summer Deaflympics in Caxias Do Sul was held at the  Ginásio Poliesportivo da UCS and SESI-SENAT Club in Caxias Do Sul from 7 to 11 May 2022.

Medal summary

Medalists

References

External links
 Deaflympics 2021

2021 Summer Deaflympics
2022 in golf
Golf tournaments in Brazil